Clement Teo is a Singaporean association football coach, currently the head coach of the Cambodian Premier League team, Boeung Ket.

He was the previous assistant coach of the S.League side, Woodlands Wellington FC. Apart from his coaching duties in Woodlands, he is usually the appointed spokesperson who addresses the media on behalf of the club. Before he was appointed as the assistant coach of the Rams, Teo was the head coach of NFL Division 2 side, Katong Football Club. He was also a S.League match commissioner.

Performance by club
The following table provides a summary of Clement's record as coach.
Statistics correct as of 13 November 2018

References

Singaporean football managers
Living people
Singaporean sportspeople of Chinese descent
Year of birth missing (living people)